Philippe Limousin (born 27 May 1948) is a French equestrian. He competed in two events at the 1988 Summer Olympics.

References

External links
 

1948 births
Living people
French male equestrians
French dressage riders
Olympic equestrians of France
Equestrians at the 1988 Summer Olympics
Place of birth missing (living people)